Shumona Sinha, also spelled Sumana Sinha; (Bengali: সুমনা সিনহা, Calcutta, 27 June 1973), is a naturalised French writer  born in Calcutta, West Bengal, India, who lives in France.

In her interviews for the French media, Shumona Sinha claims that her homeland is no longer India, nor even France, but the French language.

Early life 
Shumona Sinha was born in a Hindu middle-class family in Calcutta : her father was a professor of economics and her mother was a high school mathematics teacher. Her parents belonged to the scribal and landholding caste of Bengali Kayasthas with ancestors who were Zamindars.

As an adolescent, Shumona was an avid reader, surrounded by books bought by her parents or offered by her maternal aunt, Ratna Basu, a scholar and translator of German into sanscrit.

In 1990, she received Bengali's Best Young Poet Award.

Studies 
In 1995, at the age of 22, Shumona Sinha started learning French at Ramkrishna Mission School of Foreign Languages at Calcutta. She views her decision to study French as her personal post-colonial revolt against English, language of the former colonizers and the second official language of India.

In 1998, she studied political science and economy at the university of Calcutta. In 2001, she got a master's degree in French literature and linguistics from the Central Institute of English and Foreign Languages at Hyderabad

Career 
In 2001, she was recruited by the French embassy in India to become an English-language assistant teacher in a junior high school in Paris There, she gained an M-Phil in French language and literature from the Sorbonne University.

In 2008, she published her first novel Fenêtre sur l'abîme.

In the 2000s, she also translated and published several anthologies of Bengali and French poetry, together with her ex-husband, the writer Lionel Ray.

In 2011, her second novel, Assommons les pauvres !, was published at Éditions de l'Olivier, which won her the Prix Valery-Larbaud 2012 and the Prix Populiste in 2011; it was shortlisted for the Prix Renaudot. Assommons les pauvres! is characterized by a harsh, but multilayered poetical literary reckoning with France's asylum system.

The novel has become a part of scholarly programs to discuss the questions of  identity, exile, writing as a woman, writing in a foreign language, the relationship between literature and politics, at the Notre Dame University in Chicago, a course conducted by Alison Rice, at the American University in Paris by Anne-Marie Picard and at Institut national des langues et civilisations orientales by Tirthankar Chanda. Assommons les pauvres was adapted by several theaters in Germany and in Austria, especially by Thalia Theater in Hambourg and the Freies Werkstatt theater in Cologne.

In her third novel Calcutta, published in January 2014, Shumona Sinha goes down the memory lane of a Bengali family to describe the violent political history of West Bengal. The book was rewarded by the Grand Prix du Roman de la Société des gens de lettres and Prix du Rayonnement de la langue et de la littérature françaises of the Académie française. The English translation of Calcutta was  published by SSP, Delhi, in November 2019.

Her fourth novel Apatride, published in January 2017, is a parallel portrait of two Bengali women, one living in a village near Calcutta, caught up in a peasant insurrection and a romantic misadventure with her cousin, causing her to perish; the other one living in Paris, in a fragmented post-CharlieHebdo society, where racism of all the colors prevails.

In Le testament russe, her fifth novel, published in March 2020 by Gallimard (Blanche), she describes the fascination of a young Bengali girl, Tania, for a Russian Jewish editor in 1920 who was the founder editor of Raduga Publishers.

Shumona Sinha' books have been translated into German, Italian, Hungarian and Arabic.

Works
Fenêtre sur l'abîme; 2008, Éditions de La Différence
Assommons les pauvres !; 2011, Éditions de l'Olivier
Calcutta, 2014; Éditions de l'Olivier
Apatride, 2017; Éditions de l'Olivier
Le Testament russe, 2020; Gallimard (Blanche)

Award and distinctions 
 2012 : Prix Valery-Larbaud
 2011 : Prix Eugène Dabit du roman populiste
 2014 : Grand prix du roman de la Société des gens de lettres 
 2014 : Prix du rayonnement de la langue et de la littérature françaises de l'Académie française  
 2016 : Internationaler Literaturpreis

References

External links 
 Shumona Sinha: "J'écris comme je crache" (French)
 Shumona Sinha und die Migration in Frankreich: Zornige Zeugenschaft (German)
 Tales from France's immigration office win German International Literature Award
 Lit prize winner Shumona Sinha: 'As a writer, I search for the truth'

Writers from Kolkata
1973 births
Living people
Women writers from West Bengal
Prix Valery Larbaud winners
Poets from West Bengal
20th-century Indian poets
20th-century Indian women writers
21st-century Indian women writers
21st-century Indian writers
21st-century Indian poets
Bengali writers
French people of Indian descent
20th-century French women writers
20th-century French non-fiction writers
21st-century French women writers
21st-century French non-fiction writers
21st-century Indian novelists
Indian women poets
Indian women novelists
Novelists from West Bengal
Naturalized citizens of France